Jiří Baborovský  (1875–1946) was a prominent Czech physical chemist, and pioneer in the study of kinetic chemical reactions. He wrote many textbooks widely used in Czechoslovakia.

1875 births
1946 deaths
19th-century Czech people
20th-century Czech people
19th-century chemists
20th-century chemists
Czech chemists
People from Příbram
Austro-Hungarian people
Czechoslovak chemists